David Keith Moore (born 30 December 1953 in Sydney) is an Australian sport shooter. Since 1995, Moore had won a total of twelve medals (four golds, four silver, and four bronze) in the air, standard, centre-fire, and free pistol at the Oceania Shooting Championships. He also captured a gold medal in the free pistol pairs, along with his partner Daniel Repacholi, at the 2006 Commonwealth Games in Melbourne, with a combined score of 1,086 points. Moore competed for both air and free pistol shooting events at the 2000 Summer Olympics in Sydney, and at the 2004 Summer Olympics in Athens, but he neither reached the final round, nor claimed an Olympic medal.

Eight years after competing in his first Olympics, Moore qualified for his third Australian team, as a 54-year-old, at the 2008 Summer Olympics in Beijing, by placing second in the men's free pistol from the 2007 Oceania Shooting Championships, coincidentally in his home city Sydney. He scored a total of 571 targets in the preliminary rounds of the men's 10 m air pistol, by one point ahead of Trinidad and Tobago's Roger Daniel from the final attempt, finishing only in thirty-sixth place. Three days later, Moore placed thirty-fifth in his second event, 50 m pistol, by one point behind French sport shooter and five-time Olympian Franck Dumoulin, with a total score of 546 targets.

Olympic results

References

External links
Profile – Australian Olympic Team
NBC Olympics Profile

Australian male sport shooters
Living people
Olympic shooters of Australia
Shooters at the 2000 Summer Olympics
Shooters at the 2004 Summer Olympics
Shooters at the 2008 Summer Olympics
Shooters at the 1998 Commonwealth Games
Shooters at the 2002 Commonwealth Games
Shooters at the 2006 Commonwealth Games
Commonwealth Games gold medallists for Australia
Commonwealth Games silver medallists for Australia
Sportspeople from Sydney
1953 births
Commonwealth Games medallists in shooting
Medallists at the 1998 Commonwealth Games
Medallists at the 2002 Commonwealth Games
Medallists at the 2006 Commonwealth Games